The Energy Check Stadium is the sponsored name of three British football stadiums:

 The Energy Check Stadium at Firhill, home of Partick Thistle F.C.
 The Energy Check Stadium at Gigg Lane, home of Bury F.C.
 The Energy Check County Ground, home of Swindon Town F.C